Dimitrios Karademitros (born 6 May 1983) is a Greek footballer who plays for Apollon Smyrnis in the Greek Football League, as midfielder.

References

1983 births
Living people
Greek footballers
Apollon Smyrnis F.C. players
Association football midfielders